Evgeni Valerievich Aldonin (born 22 January 1980) is a Russian football coach and a former player.

Career
He played for FC Volga Nizhny Novgorod. He is similar to his predecessor, Alexey Smertin in that he is a hard working player who can tackle well, pass accurately, shoot from distance and is a natural born leader.

He played for Russia in the 2004 European Football Championship.

On 15 August 2006 Aldonin was selected by Russia's coach Guus Hiddink to be the captain of the National team for the friendly against Latvia which took place on 16 August 2006.

Career statistics

Honours
CSKA Moscow
Russian Premier League: 2005, 2006
Russian Cup: 2004–05, 2005–06, 2007–08, 2008–09, 2010–11
Russian Super Cup: 2004, 2006, 2007, 2009
UEFA Cup: 2004–05

References

1980 births
People from Alupka
Living people
Russian footballers
Association football midfielders
Russia international footballers
FC Rotor Volgograd players
PFC CSKA Moscow players
UEFA Cup winning players
UEFA Euro 2004 players
Russian Premier League players
Ukrainian emigrants to Russia
FC Mordovia Saransk players
FC Volga Nizhny Novgorod players